The 2008 Tercera División play-offs to Segunda División B from Tercera División (Promotion play-offs) were the final playoffs for the promotion from 2007–08 Tercera División to 2008–09 Segunda División B. In some groups four teams took part in the play-off while other groups have only three.

The teams highlighted in yellow played the Play-Offs to Segunda División B.
The teams highlighted in red were relegated to Divisiones Regionales.
All groups as 38 of 38 rounds.

Eliminatories
The regular season finished the 18 May 2008.
The play-offs began the 24 and 25 of May.

Group 1

1st Eliminatory:

2nd Eliminatory:

Promoted to Segunda División B:Sangonera Atlético

Group 2

1st Eliminatory:

2nd Eliminatory:

Promoted to Segunda División B:FC Barcelona B

Group 3

1st Eliminatory:

2nd Eliminatory:

Promoted to Segunda División B:Ciudad Santiago

Group 4

1st Eliminatory:

2nd Eliminatory:

Promoted to Segunda División B:CD San Fernando

Group 5

1st Eliminatory:

2nd Eliminatory:

Promoted to Segunda División B:Racing Santander B

Group 6

1st Eliminatory:

2nd Eliminatory:

Promoted to Segunda División B:UD Alzira

Group 7

1st Eliminatory:

2nd Eliminatory:

Promoted to Segunda División B:Las Palmas B

Group 8

1st Eliminatory:

2nd Eliminatory:

Promoted to Segunda División B:CD Roquetas

Group 9

1st Eliminatory:

2nd Eliminatory:

Promoted to Segunda División B:Antequera CF

Group 10

1st Eliminatory:

2nd Eliminatory:

Promoted to Segunda División B:Real Murcia B

Group 11

1st Eliminatory:

2nd Eliminatory:

Promoted to Segunda División B:UE Sant Andreu

Group 12

1st Eliminatory:

2nd Eliminatory:

Promoted to Segunda División B:Valencia Mestalla

Group 13

1st Eliminatory:

2nd Eliminatory:

Promoted to Segunda División B:Atlético Baleares

Group 14

1st Eliminatory:

2nd Eliminatory:

Promoted to Segunda División B:Ciudad Lorquí

Group 15

1st Eliminatory:

2nd Eliminatory:

Promoted to Segunda División B:CDA Navalcarnero

Group 16

1st Eliminatory:

2nd Eliminatory:

Promoted to Segunda División B:Balompédica Linense

Group 17

1st Eliminatory:

2nd Eliminatory:

Promoted to Segunda División B:Santa Eulàlia

Group 18

1st Eliminatory:

2nd Eliminatory:

Promoted to Segunda División B:Sporting de Gijón B

External links
Segunda División B Play-Off 2007-08 on Futbolme.com

2007-08
play
2008 Spanish football leagues play-offs